Tambien Romantica is the seventh album by Mexican singer Verónica Castro. It was released in 1983. The song "Juntos" is from "Verónica: El rostro del amor" a telenovela starring Castro and made in Argentina.

Track listing
 "HASTA QUE TE PERDI" (Roberto Belester)
 "JUNTOS"  
 "AHORA QUE ESTOY SOLA"  
 "MI GUARDIÁN, MI CARCELERO" 
 "SI REGRESAS" 
 "PORQUE TÚ YA ERAS MÍO" 
 "ESTOY DE SOBRA" 
 "EL AMOR ES ASÍ" 
 "TÚ ME PROMETISTE VOLVER" 
 "PUNTO Y SE ACABÓ"

Singles

1983 albums
Verónica Castro albums
Peerless Records albums